Charles Rayne Kruger (29 January 1922 – 21 December 2002) was a South African author and property developer.

Charles Rayne Kruger was born on 29 January 1922 in Queenstown, in the Eastern Cape, the son of an unmarried 17-year-old daughter of a British Army officer. As his father had disappeared, his mother married Victor Kruger, a Johannesburg estate agent. He was educated at Jeppe High School and the University of the Witwatersrand.

Kruger's first wife was the actress Nan Munro, a widow, 16 years older than him, with three children. They later divorced, and he married the restaurateur, chef and television presenter Prue Leith. They had a son, the Conservative MP Danny Kruger, and adopted a Cambodian daughter, Li-Da.

Publications
Tanker (Novel), London: Longman's Green & Co, 1952
The Spectacle (Crime story), London: Longman's Green & Co, 1953
Young Villain With Wings (Crime story), London: Longman's Green & Co, 1953
My Name Is Celia (Novel), London: Longman's Green & Co, 1954
The Even Keel (Crime story), London: Longman's Green & Co, 1955
Ferguson (Crime Story), London: Longman's Green & Co, 1956
Goodbye Dolly Gray: The Story of the Boer War. (Non fiction), London: Cassell, 1959
The Devil's Discus (Non fiction), London: Cassell, 1964
All Under Heaven: A Complete History of China. (Non fiction), Hoboken, New Jersey: John Wiley & Sons, 2003

References

1922 births
2002 deaths
South African writers
University of the Witwatersrand alumni
People from the Eastern Cape
Kruger family